Coyi or COYI may refer to:

 Masixole 'Coyi' Banda, a South African rugby player 
 Come On You Irons, a phrase used by West Ham United F.C. supporters